Kayode Akinsanya (born 9 June 1976) is a Nigerian badminton player. He competed in the 1996 Summer Olympics.

References

1976 births
Living people
Badminton players at the 1996 Summer Olympics
Nigerian male badminton players
Olympic badminton players of Nigeria